Gasoducto del Noreste Argentino (also known as the Argentine Northwest Gas Pipeline and GNEA pipeline) is a proposed  long natural gas pipeline to transport natural gas from  Bolivia to Argentina.

History
The pipeline project was announced in 2003.  The agreement between Bolivia and Argentina to build the pipeline was signed on 26 March 2007.

Technical features

Construction
The pipeline would be built by Techint.  The construction is expected to start in July 2008. Pipes for the pipeline would be provided by Siat or Tubacero. The pipeline is expected to be commissioned by January 2010 and it is expected to cost US$1.8 billion.

See also

 Cruz del Sur pipeline
 GasAndes Pipeline
 Paraná–Uruguaiana pipeline
 Yabog pipeline

References

External links
 Map of the pipeline route

Natural gas pipelines in Argentina
Natural gas pipelines in Bolivia
Proposed pipelines in South America
Argentina–Bolivia relations
Proposed energy infrastructure in Argentina
Proposed energy infrastructure in Bolivia